Jeison may refer to:

Jeison Angulo (born 1996), Colombian professional footballer
Jeison Guzmán (born 1998), Dominican professional baseball shortstop
Jeison Lucumí (born 1995), Colombian professional footballer
Jeison Medina (born 1995), Colombian footballer
Jeison Murillo (born 1992), Colombian professional footballer
Jeison Quiñones (born 1986), Colombian professional footballer
Jeison Rosario (born 1995), Dominican professional boxer
Jeison Suárez (born 1991), long-distance runner from Colombia